Ruben Schoeman (born 14 March 1996) is a South African rugby union player for the  in the Currie Cup and the  in the Rugby Challenge. His regular position is lock.

References

South African rugby union players
Living people
1996 births
Rugby union players from Pretoria
Rugby union locks
Golden Lions players
SWD Eagles players
Lions (United Rugby Championship) players